Summer Brothers Stores is a historic commercial building located at Newberry, Newberry County, South Carolina.  It was built in 1898, and is a row of four one-story brick commercial buildings. The front façade features a repetitive arched arcade with small circular ventilator grilles above.

It was listed on the National Register of Historic Places in 1980.

References 

Commercial buildings on the National Register of Historic Places in South Carolina
Commercial buildings completed in 1898
Buildings and structures in Newberry County, South Carolina
National Register of Historic Places in Newberry County, South Carolina
1898 establishments in South Carolina